The Challenge de Cádiz was a golf tournament on the Challenge Tour. It was played for the first time in November 2020 at Novo Sancti Petri Golf Club in Cádiz, Spain. 

Pep Anglès won the inaugural tournament.

Winner

References

External links
Coverage on the Challenge Tour's official site

Former Challenge Tour events
Golf tournaments in Spain
Recurring sporting events established in 2020